Lenin Square is the main square of Novosibirsk, located in the Tsentralny City District. It consists of Transport and Theater squares.

History

Tsarist period
In 1901 a market square appeared here, it was called the New Market Square (Novaya Bazarnaya Ploshchad). Locals and people from other Siberian cities traded here.

In 1908, businessman Fedot Makhotin opened the first stationary cinema in the city. It was located on the site of the modern entrance to the metro in the southern part of the present square.

In 1911, the City Trade House was built on the square.

Soviet period
In 1924, Building of State Institutions was constructed in the northern part of the square.

From 1926 to 1930, Prombank, Oblpotrebsoyuz Building, Business House and Gosbank were built here.

In 1944, Novosibirsk Opera and Ballet Theatre was completed on the square.

Buildings located on the square

References

Squares in Novosibirsk
Tsentralny City District, Novosibirsk